Brice Loubet (born 29 May 1995) is a French modern pentathlete.

He participated at the 2018 World Modern Pentathlon Championships, winning a medal.

References

External links

Living people
1995 births
French male modern pentathletes
World Modern Pentathlon Championships medalists
21st-century French people